Tranquilo papá is a Chilean telenovela created by Rodrigo Bastidas, that premiered on Mega on April 10, 2017 and ended on January 9, 2018. It stars Francisco Melo, Francisca Imboden, Íngrid Cruz and Fernando Godoy.

Plot 
Domingo Aldunate is a successful old-fashioned businessman. He lives in a time of ostentation, therefore, Domingo has wanted to give everything to his children: cell phones, cars, trips, etc., thus satisfying all their needs. Domingo feels guilty, like many parents, for not being present at home due to his work. Domingo does not know how to say no, especially to his wife Pepa who always wants to look young and, therefore, has many plastic surgeries. This is how his family has become of lazy and selfish. From one moment to another, Domingo decides to turn his life around to re-educate them. That is when he begins to say no, which causes a shake in the family.

Cast 
 Francisco Melo as Domingo Aldunate
 Francisca Imboden as María Josefa "Pepa" Vial
 Íngrid Cruz as Pamela Morales
 Fernando Godoy as Elvis Poblete
 Montserrat Ballarin as Cinthia Morales
 Augusto Schuster as Santiago "Santi" Aldunate
 Paula Luchsinger as Madonna Poblete
 Jaime Vadell as Agustín "Cucho" Vial
 Maricarmen Arrigorriaga as Olga Poblete
 Fernando Farías as Alberto "Don Tito" Morales
 Nicolás Saavedra as Arturo Torres
 Dayana Amigo as Soledad Aldunate
 Juan David Gálvez as Willson Lucas Fuentes
 Rodrigo Muñoz as Juan Carlos Gacitúa
 Francisco Puelles as Cristóbal Anguita
 Nicole Block as Fernanda "Fe" Aldunate
 Francisco Reyes Cristi as Raimundo "Rai" Aldunate
 Karla Melo as Natalia Flores
 Steffi Mendez as Martina Acuña
 Daniel Contesse as Bill "Gringo" Seymour
 Andres Pozo as Leandro "El Crespo" Poblete
 Cristián Gajardo as El Chino
 Pedro Campos as Pablo García
 Francisca Walker as Antonia Goycolea
 Tomás Vidiella as Leopoldo Sánchez
 María José Necochea as Marisol Cruz
 Andrea Munizaga as Lourdes
 Pelusa Troncoso as Fabiola
 Cristián Alamos as Leonel "Leo" Sepúlveda
 Sofía González as Sofía Gacitúa
 Carlos Niño as Gaspar Gacitúa
 Eduardo Niño as Benito Gacitúa
 Oscar Castro Aguirre as Sergio
 Andrea Zuckermann as Teresa
 Ángeles Valdés as Tatiana
 Yamila Reyna as Luciana de la Oz
 Sebastián Layseca as Fabio
 Nathalia Aragonese as Romina Soto
 Magdalena Müller as Laura Martínez
 Giordano Rossi as Matías Fischer

Ratings

References

External links 
 

2017 telenovelas
2017 Chilean television series debuts
2018 Chilean television series endings
Chilean telenovelas
Mega (Chilean TV channel) telenovelas
Spanish-language telenovelas